The Berlin Turnpike is a  4-lane/6-lane divided arterial road mostly carrying U.S. Route 5 (US 5) and Route 15 in New Haven County and Hartford County in the U.S. state of  Connecticut. The road begins one mile south of the Meriden-Berlin town line where Route 15 on the Wilbur Cross Parkway  merges with US 5 along North Broad Street in Meriden and terminates at the Hartford city line. The local name of the street varies as it passes through multiple towns.

 south of the Hartford city line, US 5 and Route 15 leave the turnpike and follow the Wilbur Cross Highway northeast through Hartford towards the Charter Oak Bridge.

Route description

The Berlin Turnpike begins at a fork interchange between Route 15, which continues south as the limited-access Wilbur Cross Parkway, and US 5, which continues south as a local road named Broad Street. The turnpike is the only segment of Route 15 that is not limited-access, as it has multiple at-grade intersections, some with traffic lights, as well as businesses on both sides of the road. The turnpike has grade-separated interchange with Route 9 and Route 372 in Berlin, as well as Route 175 on the border between Newington and Wethersfield.

In Wethersfield, US 5 and Route 15 leave the turnpike for the Wilbur Cross Highway heading towards Hartford. This is the western terminus of Route 314, which takes a right turn onto Jordan Lane soon after to actually proceed in the eastbound direction. From Jordan Lane to the city line, the turnpike is unsigned SR 543. At the city line, the road becomes Maple Avenue and continues north towards Downtown Hartford.

History

The Hartford and New Haven Turnpike was a toll road chartered in 1798 and built in 1798-99 to connect the cities of New Haven and Hartford in the U.S. state of Connecticut. The turnpike was built to connect the courthouses of New Haven and Hartford in as straight of a route as allowed by the terrain. Its southern terminus was at Grove Street, which forms the northern boundary of the original nine squares of New Haven. The road's straight line principle caused several intermediate town centers to be bypassed.

Since the turnpike's original construction, the roadway has been realigned and substantially widened to become the Berlin Turnpike that it is today —  a major commercial thoroughfare. Many parts of the original alignment are maintained as local roads or unsigned state roads.

Speeding issues
The long straight trajectory of the Berlin Turnpike has allowed it to become prone to excessive speeding and deadly accidents.

Major intersections

References

External links

Kurumi's Berlin Turnpike page

B
Transportation in Hartford County, Connecticut
U.S. Route 5